Koh Pring, (Jambul Island, Koh Prins(former French name) is a Cambodian island in the gulf of Thailand, 64 km off the coastal city of Sihanoukville. Official sources provide no data of civilian communities on the "Outer Islands". Administration falls to the Cambodian navy, as the island lies within the national marine border in which it represents an isolated outpost.

Geography

Koh Pring is in fact the largest island of a tiny archipelago of 3 islands (Koh Pring, Koh Doung and Koh Trangol).
Pring - ព្រីង - is Khmer for Jambul (jambolan, jamblang, or jamun), the fruit of an evergreen, flowering tropical tree.

See also
 Sihanoukville
 Koh Rong
 Koh Sdach
 List of islands of Cambodia
 List of Cambodian inland islands

References

Sihanoukville (city)
Populated places in Sihanoukville province
Islands of Cambodia
Islands of the Gulf of Thailand